The 1990 Colonial Athletic Association baseball tournament was held at Brooks Field on the campus of UNC Wilmington in Wilmington, North Carolina, from May 11 through 14.  The event determined the champion of the Colonial Athletic Association for the 1990 season.  Top-seeded  won the tournament for the third time and earned the CAA's automatic bid to the 1990 NCAA Division I baseball tournament.

Entering the event, East Carolina had won the most championships, with two.  George Mason and Richmond had each won once.

Format and seeding
The CAA's six teams were seeded one to six based on winning percentage from the conference's round robin regular season.  They played a double-elimination tournament with first round matchups of the top and bottom seeds, second and fifth seeds, and third and fourth seeds.

Bracket and results

Most Valuable Player
Calvin Brown was named Tournament Most Valuable Player.  Brown was a first baseman for East Carolina.

References

Tournament
Colonial Athletic Association Baseball Tournament
Colonial Athletic Association baseball tournament
Colonial Athletic Association baseball tournament
College baseball tournaments in North Carolina
Baseball competitions in Wilmington, North Carolina